The Sportavia-Pützer SFS 31 Milan is a single-seat motor glider that was produced in Germany in the early 1970s.

Design and development
The Milan was created by essentially combining the fuselage of the Fournier RF 4 with the wings of the Scheibe SF-27. The resulting aircraft is a conventional motorglider design, a low-wing cantilever monoplane with a nose-mounted engine. The undercarriage consists of a single retractable mainwheel, a fixed tailwheel, and an outrigger under each wing. Construction is of wood, skinned in plywood and fabric. The designation was created by combining the initials of the manufacturers involved (and Scheibe), and adding the sum of the model numbers of the two constituent aircraft designs.

The SFS 31 prototype (registered D-KORO) first flew on 31 August 1969 and soon replaced the RF 4D in production at Sportavia-Pützer. In 1971, Hans Huth piloted an SFS 31 to third place in the German national motorglider competition.

Specifications

Notes

References
 
 
 
 
 
 

1960s German sport aircraft
Sportavia-Pützer aircraft
Motor gliders
Single-engined tractor aircraft
Low-wing aircraft
Aircraft first flown in 1969